Jacques Pennewaert (11 March 1940 – 16 July 2016) was a Belgian runner. He competed in the 400 m and 800 m events at the 1964 and 1968 Olympics with the best result of eighth place in the 800 m in 1964.

References

1940 births
2016 deaths
Belgian male middle-distance runners
Belgian male sprinters
Olympic athletes of Belgium
Athletes (track and field) at the 1964 Summer Olympics
Athletes (track and field) at the 1968 Summer Olympics
Universiade medalists in athletics (track and field)
Sportspeople from Brussels
Universiade silver medalists for Belgium
Universiade bronze medalists for Belgium
Medalists at the 1961 Summer Universiade
Medalists at the 1963 Summer Universiade